Accessory nerve disorder is an injury to the spinal accessory nerve which results in diminished or absent function of the sternocleidomastoid muscle and upper portion of the trapezius muscle.

Signs and symptoms
Patients with spinal accessory nerve paralysis often exhibit signs of lower motor neuron disease such as diminished muscle mass, fasciculations, and partial paralysis of the sternocleidomastoid and trapezius muscles. Interruption of the nerve supply to the sternocleidomastoid muscle results in an asymmetric neckline, while weakness of the trapezius muscle can produce a drooping shoulder, winged scapula, and a weakness of forward elevation of the shoulder.

Causes
Medical procedures are the most common cause of injury to the spinal accessory nerve. In particular, radical neck dissection and cervical lymph node biopsy are among the most common surgical procedures that result in spinal accessory nerve damage. London notes that a failure to rapidly identify spinal accessory nerve damage may exacerbate the problem, as early intervention leads to improved outcomes.

Diagnosis
The function of the spinal accessory nerve is measured in the neurological examination. How the examination is administered varies by practitioner, but it frequently involves three components: inspection, range of motion testing, and strength testing.

During inspection, the examiner observes the sternocleidomastoid and trapezius muscles, looking for signs of lower motor neuron disease, such as muscle atrophy and fasciculation. A winged scapula may also be suggestive of abnormal spinal accessory nerve function, as described above.

In assessing range of motion, the examiner observes while the patient tilts and rotates the head, shrugs both shoulders, and abducts both arms. A winged scapula due to spinal accessory nerve damage will often be exaggerated on arm abduction.

Strength testing is similar to range of motion testing, except that the patient performs the actions against the examiner's resistance. The examiner measures sternocleidomastoid muscle function by asking the patient to turn his or her head against resistance. Simultaneously, the examiner observes the action of the contralateral sternocleidomastoid muscle. For example, if the patient turns his or her head to the right, the left sternocleidomastoid muscle normally will tighten.

To assess the strength of the trapezius muscle, the examiner asks the patient to shrug his or her shoulders against resistance. In patients with damage to the spinal accessory nerve, shoulder elevation will be diminished, and the patient will be incapable of raising the shoulders against the examiner's resistance.

Treatment
There are several options of treatment when iatrogenic (i.e., caused by the surgeon) spinal accessory nerve damage is noted during surgery. For example, during a functional neck dissection that injures the spinal accessory nerve, injury prompts the surgeon to cautiously preserve branches of C2, C3, and C4 spinal nerves that provide supplemental innervation to the trapezius muscle. Alternatively, or in addition to intraoperative procedures, postoperative procedures can also help in recovering the function of a damaged spinal accessory nerve. For example, the Eden-Lange procedure, in which remaining functional shoulder muscles are surgically repositioned, may be useful for treating trapezius muscle palsy.

References

External links 

Peripheral nervous system disorders
Disorder